Bandholi is a village in Gwalior district situated at a distance of 6 km from Murar on Gwalior-Behat road.

References

Villages in Gwalior district